Ossian Bingley Hart (January 17, 1821 – March 18, 1874) was the tenth Governor of the U.S. state of Florida, and the first governor of Florida who was born in the state. Born in Jacksonville to Isaiah Hart, one of the city's founders, he was raised on his father's plantation along the St. Johns River. He was a lawyer in Jacksonville. He moved to a farm near Fort Pierce, Florida in 1843, and was a founding member of the St. Lucie County Board of Commissioners. In 1845, Hart became Florida State Representative for St. Lucie County. In 1846 he moved to Key West where he resumed his law practice. In 1856, he moved to Tampa, Florida. Among his clients was "Adam", a black man who was lynched after the Florida Supreme Court declared his murder conviction a mistrial.

Despite his upbringing, Hart became a Republican and openly opposed secession from the United States, causing some difficult times for him during the American Civil War. Following the war, he helped reestablish the governments of the state and of the city of Jacksonville. In 1868, he was appointed a justice of the Florida Supreme Court.  In 1870, he ran unsuccessfully for U.S. Congress, only to be elected governor two years later on January 7, 1873. He appointed Jonathan Clarkson Gibbs as Florida's first African-American Superintendent of Public Instruction. During his tenure, "limited civil rights legislation was passed, and some improvements were made in the state's weakened finances." Weakened by the campaign, he fell ill with pneumonia and died in Jacksonville. He was succeeded by lieutenant governor Marcellus Stearns, Florida's last Republican governor until 1967.

References

Further reading
Official Governor's portrait and biography from the State of Florida
Brown, Canter, Jr. Ossian Bingley Hart: Florida's Loyalist Reconstruction Governor. Baton Rouge and London: Louisiana State University Press, 1997.
Morris, Allen  and Joan Perry Morris, compilers. The Florida Handbook 2007-2008 31st Biennial Edition. Page 313-4.  Peninsula Publishing. Tallahassee. 2007.  Softcover  Hardcover.

External links
 

1821 births
1874 deaths
County commissioners in Florida
Justices of the Florida Supreme Court
Republican Party governors of Florida
People from Jacksonville, Florida
Deaths from pneumonia in Florida
Members of the Florida Territorial Legislature
19th-century American politicians
19th-century American lawyers
Florida lawyers
19th-century American judges